Matt Cedeño (born November 14, 1973) is an American actor and former male fashion model, known for his roles as Brandon Walker on the NBC daytime soap opera Days of Our Lives (1999-2005), Alejandro Rubio in the Lifetime primetime comedy-drama Devious Maids (2013-2014), Vasquez on Syfy comedy horror Z Nation (2015–16), and The Highest in the BET+ soap opera Ruthless.

Personal life
Cedeño was born in Moses Lake, Washington, to an Afro-Cuban father and an Irish-English mother. He became a model doing gigs in Milan, Spain, New York and Los Angeles, which Cedeno juggled, along with academics, until he finished school. Cedeño married Erica Franco on July 31, 2009, and their son, Jaxson Cruz, was born on August 7, 2013. They welcomed their daughter, Aviana Jaselle on April 28, 2018.

Career

Cedeño is known for his role as Brandon Walker on the NBC daytime soap opera Days of Our Lives from 1999 to 2005. He has been nominated three years in a row for an ALMA award as Outstanding Actor in a Daytime Drama for his work as Walker on Days of our Lives. He played a young boxer in the 2000 feature film Price of Glory (Jimmy Smits plays the same character years later). He guest-starred on Boy Meets World, CSI: Miami, It's Always Sunny in Philadelphia, and The Mentalist.

Cedeño appeared on the one hundredth episode of ABC comedy-drama series Desperate Housewives as Umberto Rothwell, the gay husband of Edie Britt (Nicollette Sheridan). In 2013, he had a recurring role in the Lifetime comedy-drama Devious Maids during season 1 and part of season 2, playing another gay character called Alejandro Rubio.
However his character was killed off in season 2.

Cedeño starred in the Syfy television series Z Nation from 2015 to 2016. He had a recurring roles on Oprah Winfrey Network prime time soap opera Ambitions and Starz drama Power. In 2020, Cedeño was cast in the BET+ soap opera Ruthless, a show about a religious sex cult.

Filmography

Films

Television

References

External links

Official Website

1973 births
Living people
21st-century American male actors
Male actors from Washington (state)
American male television actors
American male soap opera actors
American people of English descent
American people of Cuban descent
American people of Irish descent
American male models
Hispanic and Latino American male actors
Hispanic and Latino American male models
People from Moses Lake, Washington